The mountain-top nursery-frog (Cophixalus monticola) is a species of frog in the family Microhylidae.
It is endemic to Australia.
Its natural habitat is subtropical or tropical moist montane forests.
It is threatened by habitat loss.

References

Cophixalus
Amphibians of Queensland
Taxonomy articles created by Polbot
Amphibians described in 1994
Frogs of Australia